Slava is a tradition of the ritual of glorification of one's family's patron saint, found mainly among Serbian Orthodox Christians. The family celebrates the Slava annually on the saint's feast day. In 2014 it was inscribed in UNESCO Intangible Cultural Heritage Lists of Serbia.

Overview
The Slava is a family's annual ceremony and veneration of their patron saint. It is a tribute to the family's first ancestor who was baptized into Christianity, with its presiding saint. The family's patron saint is passed down from father to son and only males are allowed to carry out the Slava's rituals. Upon marriage, women typically adopt the patron saint of their spouse although it is not uncommon for them to continue celebrating their native family's saint as well (in which case the secondary one is known as preslava). Close friends and family gather at the home for a ritual feast. Although a religious ceremony for the purpose of saint veneration, the family's intent behind the celebration is for "the good health of the living" as well as for a "general remembrance of the souls of the departed family members".

The tradition is an important ethnic marker of Serbian identity. The slogan:  was raised as a Serbian national identifier by Miloš Milojević after his travel to Kosovo and Metohija in 1871–1877. Serbs usually regard the Slava as their most significant and most solemn feast day. The tradition is also very well preserved among the Serbs worldwide.

Besides present day Serbia, Slava is also common in some of the territories where Serbian medieval state extended its rule and cultural influence, but not only there. Similar or identical traditions are found in different countries on the Balkans and not only among the Serbs, but also among Montenegrins, Macedonians, occasionally among Croats, Catholics from Boka Kotorska, Konavle, Southern Herzegovina, Bosansko Grahovo, Janjevci, Christians in Northern Albania, and Muslims among Gorani and some Bosniaks in Bosnia. A similar tradition is found in Western Bulgaria, also among some Vlachs and Aromanians.

Origin

Serbian historians consider that records of slava amongst Serbs can be traced back at least to 1018.

The tradition has its origin in the Medieval Serbia, connected to Saint Sava, the first Archbishop of the Serbs. There are indications that the institution of the Slava in the Serbian Orthodox Church dates from Saint Sava, that "in his understanding and tactful approach to Serbian folk religion", he "seems to have found a compromise formula satisfactory to both his people's pagan tradition and the requirements of theology".  The slava is a reinterpretation of a Serbian pagan rite: the ancestor-protector became a Christian saint, frequently St. Nicholas, with the pagan rite being reduced of many religious elements and frequent ceremonies and becoming a social event with the annual meeting of the family and friends.

In the scientific literature exists a discussion about the historical and ethnological origin of the Slava, which has not been completed. According to some Serbian researchers, "the thesis of how Slava is Serbian ethnic identification marker is simply delusion of the romantic and patriotic citizenry ".

Modern history
The increased effective geographic mobility brought about by the post World War II urbanization of a previously highly agrarian society, combined with the suppression of Serbian Orthodox traditions under the Communist rule, has made some aspects of the custom more relaxed. In particular, in the second half of the 20th century it became common to see traditional patriarchal families separated by great distances, so by necessity Slava came to occasionally be celebrated at more than one place by members of the same family.

While the Slava kept something of a grassroots underground popularity during the Communist period, the post-Communist revival of Serbian Orthodox traditions has brought it a resurgence. It is recognized as a distinctly (if not quite exclusively) Serbian custom, and today it is quite common for nonobservant Christians or even atheists to celebrate it in one form or another, as a hereditary family holiday and a mark of ethnocultural identification.

The custom is also helpful in genealogical studies as an indicator in kinship relations between families, such as tracing one's family to a specific region. It "becomes a simultaneous signifier of national and spiritual kinship and a core expression of the Serbian cosmology, whereby the dialectics of temporal, physical, and spiritual continuity converge into validated perceptions of cultural and social reality—re-enacted on a recurrent (annual) basis.

In November 2014 it was inscribed in the UNESCO Intangible Cultural Heritage Lists of Serbia.

Celebration

The ritual foods that are prepared for the feast are the slavski kolač (or simply kolač), a ritual bread, and koljivo (or žito), a dish of minced boiled wheat, sweetened and sometimes mixed with chopped walnuts. A beeswax candle stamped with an image of the saint is also a staple at the celebration.

Prior to the slava, a priest surrounded by family members blesses the house. This is done in front of the saint's icon and the lit candle whereby the priest recites a prayer. Every room in the house is then sprinkled with holy water along with the members of the family who are each named and wished good health.

The top of the kolač is adorned with the Christian cross, the peace dove, and other symbols. The kolač symbolizes the body of Jesus, and the wine with which the kolač is eaten represents his blood. Traditionally a woman made the bread the day before the celebration, after bathing, dressing in clean clothing, saying the Lord's Prayer, and crossing herself. The parish priest consecrates the kolač with wine; afterwards the woman of the household cuts it into quarters and turns it cut-side up. It is further cut into pieces by other family members and oldest or most important guests. In other traditions the bread is "broken" together by the guests after being ritually turned. The koljivo is a symbol of the Resurrection of Christ (cf. "if the grain does not die..." in the Gospel) and partaken in memory of the dead (deceased family members).

The rest of the feast consists of a meal, the contents of which depends on whether or not the celebration falls in a period of fasting. During a fast (post), the meal would not contain any meat but seafood (pesco-vegan).  Outside of a fasting period, these restrictions would not apply and the Slava is considered mrsna. Thus, colloquially, slavas can be referred to as posna or mrsna. Appropriately-made sweets are consumed, as well. Alcohol is served to adults.

The most common feast days are St. Nicholas (Nikoljdan, 19 December), St. George (Đurđevdan, 6 May), St. John the Baptist (Jovanjdan, 20 January), St. Demetrius (Mitrovdan, 8 November), St. Michael (Aranđelovdan, 21 November) and St. Sava (Savindan, 27 January). Dates given are according to the Gregorian calendar. The Serbian Orthodox Church uses the Julian calendar.

Many Serbian communities (villages, cities, organizations, political parties, institutions, companies, professions) also celebrate their patron saint. For example, the city of Belgrade celebrates the Ascension of Jesus Christ as its patronal feast.

See also
Koliada
Patronal feast day
Serbian culture

Annotations
Krsna slava (Крсна слава, "christened Slava") and Krsno ime (Крсно име, "christened name")

References

Further reading

Влаховић, П. (1998). Крсна слава и њена улога у породичном и друштвеном животу код Срба. В: Етно-културолошки зборник. Књ. ІV, Сврљиг, 23–32.
Чајкановић, Веселин. "Мит и религија у Срба." Српска књижевна задруга 443 (1973): 128–153.
Vasić, M. (1985). Slava-Krsno ime. u: O krsnom imenu-zbornik. Beograd: Prosveta, 218–219.
Radenković, L. R. (2013). Slava: The Serb family feast. Zbornik Matice srpske za slavistiku, (84), 9-23.

External links

 

Meals
Serbian Orthodox Church
Serbian culture
Serbian traditions
Society of Serbia
Christian culture
Eastern Orthodox Christian culture
Slavic culture
Slavic holidays
Patron saints
Saints days
Religious food and drink
Serb traditions
Serbian genealogy
Serbian words and phrases
Dining events
Cultural history of Serbia
Intangible Cultural Heritage of Humanity
Cultural heritage of Serbia
Protected Monuments of Culture
Monuments and memorials in Serbia